Naw Ohn Hla (born 5 August 1962) is a Karen democracy activist, politician, human rights defender, environmental rights and land rights activist for decades. She has been active in campaigning against the Letpadaung mining project in northern Myanmar. Naw Ohn Hla is the general secretary of United Nationalities Democracy Party (UNDP).

Early life and education
Naw was born on 5 August 1962 in Karen state to ethnic Karen parents, a daughter of Thein Aung. She currently lives in Yangon.

Career and movement
Naw Ohn Hla is a prominent advocate for land rights and political prisoners, and has been imprisoned on more than ten occasions since 1989, as a result of her peaceful efforts to free political prisoners and assist Buddhist monks during the 2007 uprising. She work for the promotion of human rights and environmental rights and also campaigned for the release of Aung San Suu Kyi while the opposition leader was under house arrest. She has repeatedly called for the suspension of the Chinese-backed Letpadaung mining project in Burma's Sagaing Region. The project is strongly opposed by local communities due its damaging effect on the environment. She was sentenced in 2013 August to two years in prison for protesting without permission against the Letpadaung copper mine. In 15 November 2013, she was one of 69 political prisoners released by a pardon from President Thein Sein. But Naw Ohn Hla is in custody again after she was arrested over a 29 Nov 2014 protest against the mining project, at which a Chinese flag was burned outside the Chinese Embassy in Yangon. She faces up to two years in jail for flag-burning case was arrested on 30 December 2014. She was still a separate lawsuit for organizing prayers in 2007 for opposition leader Aung San Suu Kyi, then under house arrest. She had also faced charges of violating the Peaceful Assembly Law in different townships court across Yangon (Pabedan, Kyauktada, Latha, and Lanmadaw) with regards to the embassy protest.

On May 15, 2015, the Dagon Township Court in Yangoon found them guilty and sentenced them to four years and four months in prison. She also sentenced to four months in prison prior to this verdict on April 2, 2015 by the Bahan Township Court for violating the Peaceful Assembly Law during a protest on September 29, 2014. She was serving in a prison sentence of six years and two months in Insein Prison for protesting. She has been released on April 17, 2016 from Insein Prison due to Presidential amnesty from President Htin Kyaw.

She is co-founder of the Rangoon-based Democracy and Peace Women Network (DPWN), which raises awareness of human rights, land rights and also campaigns against domestic violence. The Yangoon-based DPWN was honored with an N-Peace Awards, under the category of "Thinking Outside the Box" in October 2014.

In 2019, she was awarded the Karen Women of Courage Award by International Karen Organization (IKO) and honorable certificate by Karen National Union (KNU) and N-Peace Award (Thinking Outside of the Box) (2014).

In 2020, she contested the post of Yangon Region Government ethnic Karen affairs minister in the 2020 general elections representing United Nationalities Democracy Party (UNDP).

References

External links 
 Naw Ohn Hla on gettyimages
 Activists Nay Myo Zin and Naw Ohn Hla Released- RFA

1963 births
Living people
Burmese activists
Burmese human rights activists
21st-century Burmese women politicians
21st-century Burmese politicians
Burmese politicians
People from Kayin State
Burmese people of Karen descent